Mike Milner (born 21 September 1939) is an English former professional footballer who played as a centre half.

Career
Born in Hull, Milner played for Hull City,  Stockport County, Barrow, Bradford City and Goole Town.

References

1939 births
Living people
English footballers
Hull City A.F.C. players
Stockport County F.C. players
Barrow A.F.C. players
Bradford City A.F.C. players
Goole Town F.C. players
English Football League players
Footballers from Kingston upon Hull
Association football central defenders